Dis-n-Dat was an African American Miami bass hip hop duo that recorded for Epic Records.

Closely associated with popular Miami bass acts, the 69 Boyz and Quad City DJ's, Dis-n-Dat released its debut album, Bumpin' on October 11, 1994, with Quad City DJ and 69 Boyz members CC Lemonhead and Jay Ski producing the entire album. Although the album failed to match the success of some of the other Miami bass acts of the time, it did produce two semi-successful singles—"Freak Me, Baby" and "Party"—the latter of which appeared on ESPN's double-platinum Jock Jams, Volume 2. In 1995, the album was nominated for Best Rap Album at Soul Train's Lady of Soul Awards.

Discography

Album

Singles

References

American hip hop groups
Hip hop duos
American musical duos
Miami bass groups
Musical groups established in 1993
Musical groups disestablished in 1995
Musical groups from Miami
Epic Records artists
1993 establishments in Florida
African-American musical groups